Eisinger is a surname: Notable people with the name will include:

Ari Eisinger, guitarist and singer from Pennsylvania
Claudia Eisinger (born 1984), German actress
Detlev Eisinger (born 1957), German pianist
Irene Eisinger (1903–1994) German and British opera singer
Jesse Eisinger, American journalist, currently a financial reporter for ProPublica
Jo Eisinger (1909–1991), film and television writer whose career spanned more than forty years 
Selma Meerbaum-Eisinger (1924–1942), Romanian-born German-language poet, Jewish victim of the Holocaust